"Hold My Hand" is the third single from reggae artist Sean Paul's album Imperial Blaze.

A Spanish version of the song called "Agarra mi mano" was released in Latin America to promote the album although the track is not included in it, the song has received successful airplay in Latin America radios. The Latin American version can, however, be found on iTunes. The iTunes version also has this song with lyrics by Keri Hilson included.

Music video
The music video was released on 9 December 2009.
It was directed by Little X, who had worked with Sean on six different videos before: "Gimme the Light", "Get Busy", "I'm Still In Love With You", "Temperature", "(When You Gonna) Give It Up To Me" and "Come Over". X was credited for exposing Paul to a wider audience via the video for the song, "Gimme the Light". That song was a hit along with "I’m Still In Love With You", also directed by Little X.

Keri Hilson does not appear in the video, nor are her lyrics included. Shay Mitchell plays the love interest.

The song was also performed on the late night show, Lopez Tonight hosted by George Lopez on TBS.

Track listing
"Hold My Hand" iTunes version features Keri Hilson
Hold My Hand (Album Version)
Agarra Mi Mano (Spanish Version)
Hold My Hand (French Version), by Sean Paul (2010) features Zaho

Charts

References

2009 singles
Sean Paul songs
2009 songs
Atlantic Records singles